Du Bois Agett (1796–1866) was an early settler in Western Australia.  Born in 1796, he was a member of the London Stock Exchange. He arrived in the Swan River Colony in February 1830, and received land grants on the Swan and Avon Rivers, but his farming and business ventures in Western Australia failed and he was obliged to become a clerk in the Customs Department. He explored the Avon valley with Rivett Henry Bland in 1834.

References
 

1796 births
1866 deaths
Explorers of Western Australia
Settlers of Western Australia